Marisa Maria Louise Micallef was the Maltese Ambassador to the United States.  She replaced Joseph Cole who was ambassador for less than a year.  Micallef was also Maltese High Commissioner to Canada.

In April 2015, Micallef presented her Letters of Credence as High Commissioner to the Bahamas.

Biography
Micallef attended the Convent of the Sacred Heart school in Malta before graduating from the University of Malta with a degree in French and English. For the ten years prior to her appointment, she was the chairperson of Malta's housing authority.  Her cousin Mark Micallef was Malta's ambassador to Spain.

References

Ambassadors of Malta to the United States
High Commissioners of Malta to Canada
Women ambassadors
High Commissioners to the Bahamas
Year of birth missing (living people)
Living people